Howz-e Sorkh (also Romanized as Ḩowẕ-e Sorkh; also known as Mortazāneh, Mortazavī, Mortazavīyeh Ḩowz-e Sorkh, and Murtazāneh) is a village in Pain Velayat Rural District, in the Central District of Torbat-e Heydarieh County, Razavi Khorasan Province, Iran. At the 2006 census, its population was 581, with 154 families living in the town.

References 

Populated places in Torbat-e Heydarieh County